The Spring 2008 New York Fashion Week, officially called Mercedes-Benz Fashion Week, was held between September 5 and September 12, 2007.


Fashion shows

Notes

a.  Named on the official fashion week schedule

b.  Reviewed at style.com

References

Further reading
 Agence France-Presse. "NY fashion week wrap-up". The Age (September 14, 2007).
 Associated Press. "At New York Fashion Week, modesty is replacing overexposure". International Herald Tribune (September 11, 2007).
 Critchell, Samantha (Associated Press). "Time for Optimism, at Least in Wardrobe". Washington Post (September 13, 2007).
 Crow, Kim. "Fashion week: Spring collections let us grow up gracefully". The Plain Dealer (September 12, 2007).
 "Impressions From Fashion Week". CBS News (September 13, 2007).
Jones, LaMont. "Ten fashion trends emerge during Fashion Week". Pittsburgh Post-Gazette (September 14, 2007).
Melocco, Jen. "NY fashion guide to summer". The Daily Telegraph'' (September 14, 2007).

New York Fashion Week 2008
2000s fashion
2007 in New York City
2007 in fashion
Fashion weeks